American singer, songwriter, and actress Ariana Grande's music career began in 2008, when she contributed vocals to the cast recording of the musical 13. She subsequently went on to contribute to the soundtrack albums of the Nickelodeon TV sitcom Victorious, in which she also starred from 2010 to 2013. Three soundtrack albums were released between 2011 and 2012. In 2011, Grande also began to work as an independent artist outside of television, releasing "Put Your Hearts Up", a bubblegum pop song, the same year. Retrospectively, Grande has expressed dissatisfaction with the song, claiming it to be inauthentic to her artistry, resulting in its removal from YouTube. Following this, Republic Records granted Grande more creative control over the production of her debut album.

Yours Truly was released in September 2013. It was preceded by the release of her debut single, a R&B song called "The Way" featuring Mac Miller. The song was written by Miller, Harmony Samuels, Amber Streeter, Al Sherrod Lambert, Brenda Russell and American recording artist Jordin Sparks. Follow-up singles included the 1990s-R&B-influenced "Baby I", and "Right There" featuring Big Sean, which Grande stated served as a sequel to "The Way". Grande worked with Babyface on the album's opener "Honeymoon Avenue" and recorded a duet with Nathan Sykes called "Almost Is Never Enough". Christmas Kisses, Grande's first extended play, was released in December 2013. The EP, which consisted of four songs, was primarily Christmas music, and featured a collaboration with Elizabeth Gillies.

Grande's second studio album, My Everything, was released in August 2014. The lead single, "Problem" featured Iggy Azalea and Big Sean (uncredited) and incorporated elements of jazz and funk. "Break Free" is an EDM song produced by Zedd, which Grande considered experimental for her as it deviated from her usual pop-R&B styles. "Break Your Heart Right Back", featuring Childish Gambino, utilized two samples: "Mo Money Mo Problems" by The Notorious B.I.G. and "I'm Coming Out" by Diana Ross. Other contributing songwriters and producers on My Everything included Ryan Tedder and David Guetta, who composed "One Last Time", and Harry Styles former member of British boyband One Direction, who co-wrote "Just a Little Bit of Your Heart". In November 2014, Grande was featured on Major Lazer's song "All My Love", which was included on the soundtrack to the film The Hunger Games: Mockingjay – Part 1 (2014). The same month, Grande released a Christmas song titled "Santa Tell Me".

Grande's third studio album Dangerous Woman, was released in May 2016. Initially titled Moonlight, development on the album began in 2015. The album's intended lead single "Focus" was released in October 2015. It was ultimately scrapped from the record, although the song would later serve as a bonus track on the Japanese deluxe edition. Grande replaced it with the title track, which incorporated an arena rock chorus and a guitar solo during its bridge, followed by "Into You" and "Side to Side", featuring Nicki Minaj, a dancehall and reggae-pop song. Promotional singles included "Be Alright" and "Let Me Love You" featuring Lil Wayne. The album also featured collaborations with Macy Gray and Future, who was featured on the fourth and final single "Everyday", released in January 2017. The album and its singles were commercially successful, landing in the top ten of most countries worldwide.

Grande's fourth studio album, Sweetener, was released in August 2018 to universal acclaim. The lead single, "No Tears Left to Cry", which incorporated a UK garage beat,  was released in April 2018 and was followed by "God Is a Woman", a predominantly mid-tempo pop song with trap elements, in July of the same year. Grande also teamed up again with Minaj on "The Light Is Coming", which served as the album's sole promotional single in June. "Breathin", a dance-pop song containing influences of synth-pop was released as the third single in September. Sonically, Sweetener was considered highly experimental for Grande, consisting primarily of pop, R&B, and trap songs, with heavily incorporated elements of house, funk, neo soul and hip-hop. The album and its singles reached top ten positions of several countries globally, and became Grande's most well-received record up to that point.

Grande's fifth studio album, Thank U, Next, was released in February 2019. Co-writing all 12 of its tracks, Thank U, Next was considered Grande's most personal record up to that point. The album earned praise for its vulnerability and cohesiveness, while its songs heavily incorporated hip hop. It peaked at atop the US Billboard 200 albums chart for two weeks. The album spawned the international number-one hits "Thank U, Next", "7 Rings" and "Break Up With Your Girlfriend, I'm Bored". In the US, Grande became the only artist since The Beatles to simultaneously occupy the top three spots on the Billboard Hot 100 with the aforementioned singles. Additionally, all of the album's tracks charted within the top fifty simultaneously. With this album, Grande opted to work on the album with collaborators with shared rapport, such as frequent contributors Victoria Monét, Max Martin, Ilya and Tommy Brown. 

In October 2020, Grande released her sixth studio album Positions, which delved deeper into R&B whilst maintaining pop styles. For the album's production, Grande worked primarily with Brown, while also enlisting producers she had never worked with in her career, including London on da Track, Murda Beatz and Scott Storch. Collaborators include Doja Cat, The Weeknd and Ty Dolla Sign, with Megan Thee Stallion appearing on the deluxe edition. It spawned three singles; the title track, "34+35" and "POV". Recorded during the COVID-19 pandemic, Grande developed the album with focus on her vocals and to convey emotional healing.

Songs

Unreleased songs

See also
Ariana Grande discography
Max Martin production discography

References

External links
Ariana Grande discography on AllMusic

 
Grande, Ariana